Convoy HX 65 was a North Atlantic convoy of the HX series which ran during the battle of the Atlantic in World War II. It was the 65th of the numbered series of merchant convoy] run by the Allies from Halifax to Liverpool. The convoy was attacked by German U-boats and aircraft, losing eight of its 51 ships sunk and a further three damaged. One U-boat was damaged.

Background
HX 65 formed of three sections sailing from the Americas, and was to divide into two sections for the landfall in the United Kingdom. 
The main body, of 13 ships,  departed Halifax on 12 August 1940; with ships gathered from the US eastern seaboard; it was led by convoy commodore V.Adm. BG Washington in the steamship Harpalyce. It was accompanied by its ocean escort, the Armed Merchant Cruiser Voltaire, and a local escort of two RCN warships. 
It was joined on 14 August by 16 ships from Sydney, on Cape Breton Island, also with a local escort. These had gathered from ports on the St Lawrence and the Great Lakes.
On 16 August the convoy was joined by BHX 65, 22 ships from the Caribbean and South America, that had gathered at Bermuda, departing there on 11 August escorted by the armed merchant cruiser  .

Ranged against HX 65 were U-boats of the German Navy's 1st, 2nd and 7th U-boat Flotillas, operating from Kiel and Wilhelmshaven.

Action
On 22 August HX 65's Western Approaches escort began to arrive; the destroyer  and the corvette  left the outbound OA 201, arriving later that day. On 24 August the destroyer  and the corvette  arrived from OB 201.

She was attacked and sunk, leaving two boats of survivors in bad weather and rough seas. They made landfall in the Hebrides over the next two days.

On the evening of 24 August the convoy divided, one section (referred to in some sources as HX 65A) of 20 ships bound for Methil on Scotland's east coast via Cape Wrath and the north of Scotland, and a second section (HX 65 B) of 22 ships bound for Liverpool.

The Methil section, led by Harpalyce and  escorted by Skeena and Godetia was found by U-48, which  attacked during the night of 24/25 August, sinking 2 ships, Empire Merlin and Athelcrest. She was counterattacked by Godetia but escaped without damage.
U-32 made a perfunctory attack, which failed.
U-124 fired four torpedoes and claimed four ships sunk; the actual success was two ships sunk (Harpalyce and Fircrest) and another (Stakesby) damaged. Harpalyce and Fircrest went down quickly with heavy loss of life. Stakesby was abandoned, but was later salvaged by the tug Thames and repaired. U-124 was counterattacked by Godetia and damaged when she ran onto a rock. After the corvette had left, U-124 was unable to continue convoy operations relegated to weather reporting. 
On the evening of 26 August  the convoy came under air attack near Kinnaird Head by Luftwaffe aircraft from occupied Norway; eight Ju 88s of KG 30 based at Aalborg. four ships were hit; one was sunk and three damaged. Nellie and City of Hankow made port safely, but Cape York sank under tow on the following day. Later on the night of 26/27 August a second air attack by four He 115 torpedo bombers of KuFlGr 506, based in  Stavanger, hit Remuera, which sank. The remaining 16 ships arrived at safely at  Methil on 27th.

Several tankers had fallen out of the convoy, to be chivvied by the escort, and one of these, Pecten, was torpedoed by U-57. The escort counter-attacked, but U-57 escaped. This section was also reinforced on 26 August, by the sloop . No further attacks developed and the 21 ships arrived without further incident at Liverpool on 27 August.

Forces involved

Allied forces

Merchant ships
Convoy information is from Arnold Hague's Convoyweb

Escort
Escort  information is from Arnold Hague's Convoyweb

Axis forces

References

Bibliography
Blair, Clay (1996) Hitler’s U-boat War Vol I Cassell

External links
HX.65 at convoyweb

HX065
Naval battles of World War II involving Canada